The William H. Twenhofel Medal is the highest award given by the Society for Sedimentary Geology (SEPM). It was instituted in memory of William H. Twenhofel and is awarded annually to a person for his or her "Outstanding Contributions to Sedimentary Geology."
 
Nominees are chosen for having made outstanding contributions to paleontology, sedimentology, stratigraphy, and/or allied scientific disciplines. The contributions normally involve extensive personal research, but may involve some combination of research, teaching, administration, or other activities which have notably advanced scientific knowledge in Sedimentary Geology.

Past recipients
Source: 

(NM) denotes that the recipient was not a member of SEPM.

See also

 List of geology awards

References

External links
Society for Sedimentary Geology Past Awards

Twenhofel
Awards established in 1973